Toccara Williams is a former basketball point guard who played for the WNBA's San Antonio Silver Stars in the 2004 season. Prior to playing in the WNBA, she played college basketball at Texas A&M from 2000 to 2004. In her senior year, she led the nation for steals per game among Division I teams with an average of 4.1 steals per game. She was then selected in the third round of the 2004 WNBA Draft. Toccara also played professionally overseas in Turkey, Korea, China, and Israel. Williams now has a non profit organization called Sweet Rebound that is geared towards the youth by utilizing sports as a platform for education.

She is one of only two NCAA Division I women's players to have recorded a steal in each game of her career, and is the only one of the two to have also recorded an assist in each of her college games.

Texas  A&M statistics
Source

References

External links
Official WNBA stats page

Living people
American women's basketball players
Point guards
San Antonio Silver Stars draft picks
Williams, Toccara
Texas A&M Aggies women's basketball players
Year of birth missing (living people)